Magomed Ruslanovich Guguyev (born 15 September 1988) is a Russian professional football player.

Club career
He made his Russian Football National League debut for FC Angusht Nazran on 7 July 2013 in a game against FC Neftekhimik Nizhnekamsk.

External links
 
 
 

1988 births
Sportspeople from Grozny
Living people
Russian footballers
Association football forwards
PFC Spartak Nalchik players
FC Angusht Nazran players
FC Armavir players
FC Urozhay Krasnodar players
FC Dynamo Stavropol players